Cobham Park is a set of about 22 apartments in and around a converted country mansion and associated lawn, gardens, fields and woodlands in the mainly rural south of the parish of Cobham, Surrey in England. Its old extent takes in the majority of Downside, Surrey, centred on a row of staff cottages.

A medieval predecessor was home to a local lord of the manor. In the 1720s a new mansion was built in the large grounds. John Ligonier, 1st Earl Ligonier made it his home and within a few decades it was bought by Harvey Christian Combe, of Combe Delafield and Co. brewery, a member of the Combe family and once elected Lord Mayor of London. Much of the estate, but excluding the main house, is owned by the same family. There are fields on the quite high left bank of the River Mole; much of it is protected Metropolitan Green Belt and the subject of other environmental protections.

History

Downe Place
Early indications of a principal residence at Downe date from the 12th century, identified with Downside, which became the most important private estate in the parish of Cobham. There are records of royal patronage from the late 13th century. Downe Place was the home of the Downe (or Adowne) family for many generations, with heriots to Chertsey Abbey. H.E. Malden followed E.W. Brayley in deriving the locality name "Downside" from the family, but T.E.C. Walker more credibly derived the family's name from the location, referring to the hill or down near the river on that side of Cobham. That house was later also known as "Downe Hall". As Walker clarified, the direct connection of Downe Place and its estates with the Downe family ceased in 1720 when they were sold by the heirs of Jane Smither (née Downe), sister of John Downe of Cobham (died 1656), to Frances, Lady Lanesborough, widow of George Lane, 1st Viscount Lanesborough. Lady Lanesborough had purchased the manor of Cobham from the Gavell family in 1708. Brayley writes of Cobham Park (i.e., the mansion) as having formerly been called Downe Place, but the historian David Taylor shows that the old Downe Place probably stood near Downside Farm, and not on the site of the Cobham Park mansion.

Cobham Park
A new house known as Cobham Park was built in the classical style in the 1720s by John Bridges. The design was based on an Italian villa of the 1680s. A description in Daniel Defoe's A Tour Through The Whole Island of Great Britain reads "... for the size of this House, there is hardly any other near London, which has more useful and elegant Apartments". The grounds were also landscaped and the River Mole diverted.

In the 1840s it remained, according to historian Brayley, "a handsome and substantial building, nearly of a square form, and has a neat portico, which was erected some years ago in place of a veranda. It includes a good saloon with a coved and ornamented ceiling, (now a billiard room), a library, and other convenient apartments, embellished with a few marble busts, and some good pictures."

In around 1750, John Ligonier, 1st Earl Ligonier occupied and bought Cobham Park and entertained William Pitt the Elder at a party soon afterwards. Ligonier appears to have used Cobham Park as a place of retreat and leisure (apparently he had a harem of four young women). The house passed to a nephew Edward, who died childless twelve years later in 1782.

In 1806, Cobham Park was purchased by Harvey Christian Combe, a brewer, for £30,000. Harvey died in 1818 and left the house to his son Harvey, who died in 1857; the house then passed to a nephew, Charles Combe. The house was destroyed by fire in the early 1870s.

A new house was built on the same foundations and completed in 1873 to a design by Edward Middleton Barry, third son of Sir Charles Barry, architect of the Palace of Westminster. Pevsner does not appear to have liked the new house, describing it as "very ugly French Renaissance". The Combe family left the house in the 1930s — Charles Combe moved to the opposite extreme of the parish, Painshill Park, in 1904. Later, family members moved into other houses on the estate, notably Cobham Court, Cossins House and Cobham Lodge.

The house was then leased from the Combes by Eagle Star Insurance group (subsequently acquired by Zurich Financial Services) as a venue and offices until 1958. In the 1960s and 1970s, various companies leased parts of the mansion house as office/conference facilities, in a creaking state of repair. In 1979 Logica leased the house and outbuildings. It later bought the freehold from the Combes and restored the buildings.

Logica sold the house for £5.5 million in 2001 to Frogmore Estates, which sold or leased it to Beechcroft (then a subsidiary of John Laing plc), which converted the house and outbuildings, and built new apartments on the site, to make a total of around 22 luxury retirement apartments.

References

Hamlets in Surrey
Parks and open spaces in Surrey
Country houses in Surrey
Edward Middleton Barry buildings